Trendsetter is the debut studio album by American rapper and singer Coi Leray. It was released through Uptown Records, Republic Records and 1801 on April 8, 2022. The album contains guest appearances from Nicki Minaj, Yung Bleu, Fivio Foreign, Young M.A, G Herbo, H.E.R., Nav, Lil Durk, Wallo267, King Gillie, Polo G, Lil Tecca, A Boogie wit da Hoodie, and Pooh Shiesty. Production was handled by Leray herself, Dr. Luke, Rocco Did It Again!, Ryan Ogren, Needlz, Maaly Raw, Chief Keef, Mustard, and Nic Nac, among others. Trendsetter is a hip hop and pop album.

Background
In June 2021, Leray was interviewed by the Two Bees TV at the 2021 BET Hip Hop Awards, in which she said that Trendsetter would be released in September of the same year and revealed some of the artists who would contribute to the album, including H.E.R., A Boogie wit da Hoodie, and Nav. On October 1, 2021, she stated that she was ready to release an album, but Republic Records, the record label that she is signed to did not think so and she was following their plan. Leray announced that she had completed the album in December 2021.

On April 8, 2022, the same day that Trendsetter was released, Leray was interviewed by Nick and Eddie of Apple Music, in which she expressed her gratitude for artists appearing on the album by describing it as "a dream come true" and furtherly explaining: I would feel very, very weird if nobody wanted to work with me. At this point, it’s like, "Damn, what am I doing this for if nobody with my music and nobody wants to work at that?" I don't know, I grew up listening to all those people on my featured list, and to be able to have an actual collab with them is a dream come true still to this day, don't care how big, even if I'm bigger than the artists on there, it's a dream come true to always work with every single last person on my project.

Release and promotion
On March 28, 2022, Leray announced the release date of the album and shared its cover art, deeming the album as "one of the biggest female artist albums in the world". Three days later, she revealed the list of artists that would appear on the album. She revealed the tracklist on April 4, 2022.

Critical reception

Trendsetter was met with mixed reviews from music critics. At Metacritic, which assigns a normalized rating out of 100 to reviews from mainstream publications, the album received an average score of 60 based on four reviews, which indicates "mixed or average reviews".

TiVo Staff of AllMusic described the album as "more of a trend follower than anything", adding that "loose ideas that could conceivably be cleaned up for a Doja Cat album, the main issue is that there's a lack of originality and unique spirit to set these tracks apart from any number of similar-sounding songs by other more capable artists" and "in addition to often sleepy and forgettable production, Leray's flow leaves much to be desired", and even the guest artists do not make the album exciting. HipHopDX music critic Anthony Malone stated that "the faults in Trendsetter come mostly because she relies on the star power brought by her guests but negates her ability to identify herself within the music" and that "she likely has a future in the industry, but to stand on her own, she will need to start setting the trends, rather than following them". Joshua Robinson of HotNewHipHop opined that "thanks to its producers and featured artists, Coi Leray's album is filled with entertaining performances from some of the most well-known rappers in the music industry", adding that "even when Coi sidesteps the shadows of her high-profile contributors to deliver a respectable amount of solo cuts, Trendsetter remains an album that's hard to truly despise" and "its vast array of sounds to its cast of supporting contributors, Trendsetter is so deeply embedded in contemporary Hip-Hop that listeners much decide whether they hate Coi Leray or the current state of rap". Pitchfork music critic Dylan Green "as a whole, Trendsetter is too wide-ranging and unfocused to scan as the proper debut she aspires for it to be", "but when she does lock in, her mission couldn’t be clearer". Mosi Reeves of Rolling Stone felt that "despite being a splashy, major label-backed coming-out party for Leray, Trendsetter can sound provocatively weird" and "her lyrics can come off awkward and forced".

Singles
The lead single of the album, the remix of Leray's 2021 single, "No More Parties", features American rapper Lil Durk and was released on February 19, 2021. The second single, "Big Purr (Prrdd)", which features American rapper Pooh Shiesty, was released on March 26, 2021. The third single, "Twinnem", was released on September 20, 2021 and became viral on TikTok as soon as it came out. The fourth single, "Anxiety", was released on January 28, 2022. The fifth and final single, "Blick Blick", a collaboration with Trinidadian-American rapper Nicki Minaj, was released on March 18, 2022.

Track listing

Charts

References

2022 debut albums
Republic Records albums
Albums produced by Dr. Luke
Albums produced by Ryan Ogren
Albums produced by Needlz
Albums produced by Chief Keef
Albums produced by DJ Mustard